Cambridge Township was a township in Ontario, Canada. Along with Clarence Township, Russell Township and Cumberland Township, Cambridge Township was one of the four townships of Russell County.

It was created in 1800. It existed for 198 years before becoming part of The Nation Municipality in 1998, during the Eastern Ontario municipal fusions.

Major communities in what was Cambridge Township are Limoges and St. Albert. Other communities include Benoit, Gagnon, Longtinville, Martels Corners and Mayerville.

According to the Canada 2001 Census:
 Population: 6,628
 1996-2001 Population Change (%): 3.5
 Total Private Dwellings:  2,204
 Population Density:  25.9 people per square kilometre.
 Land Area:  255.76 square kilometres.

See also
List of townships in Ontario

References

Former township municipalities in Ontario